The Blanche River rises in Blanc Lake and flows through the unorganized territory of Lac-Blanc and the municipality of Rivière-à-Pierre in the MRC Portneuf, in the administrative region of Capitale-Nationale, on the North Shore of St. Lawrence River in the province of Quebec in Canada.

Geography 

Its source is Blanc Lake (Lac Blanc), where a dam is built at the mouth. Over a dozen smaller lakes from the surrounding area flow into the White Lake. Downstream, the waters of the White River flow through a series of lakes (Lupe lakes, Ralph, Gilles, Tony, Lietto and Lorenzo lakes)  to the village of Rivière-à-Pierre, where its mouth pours into Rivière à Pierre. 

The Portneuf Wildlife Reserve includes the middle part of the watershed of the White River. The northern part of the watershed includes the Central and Perriere lakes. The northern part of the watershed of the White River is integrated into the Zec of the White River, including lakes Lorenzo and Tony.

Toponymy 

The following names are all interconnected and have been included in the Bank of place names in Commission de toponymie du Québec (Geographical Names Board of Quebec):
 "Unorganized territory of White Lake", recorded as of March 13, 1986,
 "Zec of the White River", listed on 5 August 1982,
 "White River", recorded December 5, 1968
 "White Lake", recorded as of December 5, 1968, is the largest lake in the Unorganized Territory of White Lake.

See also 
 Unorganized territory of Lac-Blanc
 Blanc Lake (Lac-Blanc)
 Rivière-à-Pierre
 Batiscanie
 Batiscan River
 Portneuf Wildlife Reserve
 Laurentides Wildlife Reserve
 Portneuf Regional County Municipality (RCM)
 List of rivers of Quebec

References 

 

Rivers of Capitale-Nationale